[[Image:Madonna-and-child-with-saint-john-the-baptist-and-saint-catherine-of-alexandria-Neroccio.jpg|thumb|250px|The Madonna and Child between John the Baptist and Saint Catherine]]
Neroccio di Bartolomeo de' Landi (1447–1500) was an Italian painter and sculptor of the early-Renaissance or Quattrocento period in Siena.

He was a student of Vecchietta, and then he shared a workshop with Francesco di Giorgio from 1468.  He painted Scenes from the life of St Benedict, now in the Uffizi, probably in collaboration with di Giorgio, and Madonna and Child between Saint Jerome and Saint Bernard, which is in the Pinacoteca Nazionale of Siena. In 1472 he painted an Assumption for the abbey of Monte Oliveto Maggiore, and in 1475 he created a statue of Saint Catherine of Siena for the Sienese church dedicated to her.

He separated from di Giorgio in 1475. In 1476, he painted Madonna and Child with St Michael and St Bernardino, a triptych now located in the Pinacoteca Nazionale of Siena. In 1483, he designed the Hellespontine Sybil for the mosaic pavement of the Cathedral of Siena, and the tomb for the Bishop Tommaso Piccolomini del Testa.

References

External links
Italian Paintings: Sienese and Central Italian Schools, a collection catalog containing information about Neroccio and his works (see index: Neroccio''; plates 66–67).

1447 births
1500 deaths
15th-century Italian painters
Italian male painters
Italian sculptors
Italian male sculptors
Painters from Siena
Italian Renaissance painters